The village of Cämmerswalde in the municipality of Neuhausen/Erzgeb is in the south of the Saxon district of Mittelsachsen in eastern Germany. The state-recognised spa resort with its 800-year-old history, lies near Seiffen in the eastern part of the Western Ore Mountains not far from the Czech border. The village is a classic Waldhufendorf, with a length of over five kilometres. Cämmerswalde is divided into Oberdorf, Mitteldorf and Niederdorf (upper, middle and lower village). Since 1994, Cämmerswalde has belonged to the municipality of Neuhausen/Erzgeb, but used to be an independent parish with the hamlets of  Deutschgeorgenthal, Haindorf and, from 1924, Neuwernsdorf and Rauschenbach.

References

Literature 
 Festschrift 750 Jahre Cämmerswalde. Reinhard Rodefeld, 1957
 Festschrift 800 Jahre Cämmerswalde. Festausschuss, Reinhold Hegewald, 2007
 
 Max Rennau: Zur ältesten Geschichte der Kirche in Cämmerswalde. Erzgebirgischer Generalanzeiger, 1930
 Historisches Ortsnamenbuch von Sachsen. 3 volumes, ed. by Ernst Eichler and Hans Walther, revised by Ernst Eichler, Volkmar Hellfritzsch, Hans Walther and Erika Weber (sources and research into Saxon history 21), Berlin, 2001, Vol. I, p. 135
 Beschreibende Darstellung der älteren Bau- und Kunstdenkmäler des Königreichs Sachsen. 41 eds., Eds. 1–15 revised by Richard Steche, Eds. 16–41 revised by Cornelius Gurlitt, Dresden, 1882–1923, Ed. 3, p. 3

External links 

 Official homepage of Neuhausen
 Organs in the parish of Freiberg
 

Former municipalities in Saxony
Spa towns in Germany
Neuhausen, Saxony